Derry Brabbs is a British landscape photographer and author. From 1984 onwards he worked with Alfred Wainwright on a series of books, including Fellwalking with Wainwright which won the 1985  Lakeland Book of the Year.

He judged the annual photographic society of the Wainwright Society from 2003 to 2016; the 2016 winner Terry Abrams took over as judge from 2017.

In 2017 he published Pilgrimage, after walking and photographing 10 major European pilgrim routes.

Personal life and family
Brabbs was born in Sheffield, South Yorkshire. His daughter Olivia Brabbs is also a photographer.

Selected publications

As author and photographer
2020 Great Pilgrimage Sites of Europe Publication October 2020
2017 Pilgrimage: The Great Pilgrim Routes of Britain and Europe
2013 A Year in the Life of Rutland
2010 The River Thames
2008 Hadrian's Wall
2008 The Roads to Santiago: The Medieval Pilgrimage Routes Through France and Spain to Santiago De Compostela
2007 A Year in the Life of the Welsh Marches
2005 In The Footprints of Wainwright
2001 England's Heritage
1999 Abbeys & Monasteries
1998 Landmark: Cottages, Castles and Curiosities of Britain
1986 English Country Pubs
1985 English Country Churches

As photographer
2014 Wainwright on the Pennine Way 
2010 Rambler's Rewards Elizabeth Guy & Pat Kirkbride
2009 Coast to Coast with Wainwright
2006 Fellwalking with Wainwright
2003 Living The Past, Val Horsler
2002 Dickie Bird's Britain, Dickie Bird
2000 Timpson's Leylines, John Timpson
1999 James Herriot's Yorkshire Revisited, James Herriot
1992 Wainwright in the Valleys of Lakeland, Alfred Wainwright
1991 Wainwright's Favourite Lakeland Mountains, Alfred Wainwright
1989 Wainwright on the Lakeland Mountain Passes, Alfred Wainwright
1988 Rural England: Our Countryside at the Crossroads Derrik Puttnam & David Mercer
1988 Short Walks in English Towns, Bryn Frank
1988 Wainwright in Scotland, Alfred Wainwright
1987 Wainwright's Coast to Coast Walk, Alfred Wainwright
1985 Wainwright on the Pennine Way, Alfred Wainwright
1984 Fellwalking with Wainwright, Alfred Wainwright
1983 The Book of the Thames, Alan Jenkins
1983 Angela Rippon's West Country, Angela Rippon
1981 Wynford Vaughan Thomas's Wales, Wynford Vaughan-Thomas
1979 James Herriot's Yorkshire, James Herriot

References

External links

 Interview c.2009

Year of birth missing (living people)
Living people
20th-century British photographers
21st-century British photographers
Photographers from Yorkshire